"Opus de Funk" (sometimes "Opus De Funk") is a composition by Horace Silver. The original version, by Silver's trio, was recorded on November 23, 1953.

Composition
It is "a typical Silver creation: advanced in its harmonic structure and general approach but with a catchy tune and finger-snapping beat." This was an early use of the word "funk" in a song title.

Original recording and release
The piece was first recorded on November 23, 1953, by the Horace Silver Trio, of Silver (piano), Percy Heath (bass), and Art Blakey (drums). It was released with other Silver and Blakey recordings as part of the Blue Note Records 10-inch Horace Silver Trio, Vol. 2 and Art Blakey - Sabu, then on the 12-inch Horace Silver Trio and Art Blakey-Sabu. The track was also released as a single around 1954.

Later versions
As of 2014, more than 60 versions of the song had been recorded.

References

1953 songs
Compositions by Horace Silver